Natashia Holmes (born June 4, 1975) is an American politician who serves as the alderman of the 7th ward of the City of Chicago. Holmes was appointed by the Chicago City Council and Mayor Rahm Emanuel, replacing Sandi Jackson, who resigned in January 2013 due to personal and legal problems. Holmes was sworn in on February 13, 2013.

Education and career
Holmes earned a bachelor's degree from Alabama State University's College of Education in 1997, a Masters in Community Planning from Auburn University in 2000, and a Juris Doctor degree and certificate in Environmental and Energy Law from Chicago-Kent College of Law in 2011. An urban planner, she has worked as a Transportation Planning Liaison for the DuPage Mayors and Managers Conference, and held positions with the Illinois Department of Transportation's Division of Public and Intermodal Transportation. Prior to her appointment as alderman, she was a project manager for Metro Strategies, a Glen Ellyn, Illinois-based planning, policy and public affairs consulting firm. She also serves on the external advisory board for the Institute for Environmental Science and Policy at the University of Illinois at Chicago, and was a community representative to the local school council of the Adam Clayton Powell Paideia Community Academy in the city's South Shore neighborhood.

References 

1975 births
Living people
African-American city council members in Illinois
African-American women in politics
Alabama State University alumni
Chicago City Council members
Women city councillors in Illinois
Chicago City Council members appointed by Rahm Emanuel
21st-century American women politicians